Retour de manivelle is a 1957 French crime drama film directed by Denys de La Patellière who co-wrote screenplay with Michel Audiard, based on the 1956 novel There's Always a Price Tag by James Hadley Chase. The film stars Michèle Morgan, Daniel Gélin and Michèle Mercier.

Synopsis
Penniless painter Robert Mabillon rescues rich man Eric Freminger one evening, when he is trying to throw himself under the wheels of a car. After having gotten quite drunk, Mabillon proposes to renew his luxurious villa in Saint-Jean-Cap on the French Riviera. Nevertheless, Freminger convinces him to become his driver. The same night, Mabillon has witnessed a violent dispute between his host and his seductive wife, Helen. Some time later, he receives a visit by the latter, its intimate ordered to leave as soon as possible to their homes ...

Cast
Michèle Morgan: Hélène Fréminger
Daniel Gélin: Robert Montillon
Michèle Mercier: Jeanne
François Chaumette: Charles Babin
Pierre Leproux: M. Bost, le créancier
Jean Olivier: L' inspecteur-adjoint (as Jean Ollivier)
Hélène Roussel: Une secrétaire
Peter van Eyck: Eric Fréminger
Bernard Blier: Le commissaire Plantavin

Production crew
Director: Denys de La Patellière
Writer: Denys de La Patellière after the work of James Hadley Chase
Producer: Jean-Paul Guibert
Director of photography: Pierre Montazels

Production companies are Cinematografica Associata (Italy) and Films Intermondia (France).

External links
Retour de manivelle at Alice Cinema

1957 films
1957 crime drama films
Italian drama films
French drama films
1950s French-language films
Films based on works by James Hadley Chase
Films based on British novels
Films directed by Denys de La Patellière
Films with screenplays by Michel Audiard
1950s French films
1950s Italian films